Lepidiolamprologus boulengeri is a species of cichlid endemic to Lake Tanganyika where it is known from the Tanzanian coast in the northern part of the lake.  Pairs of this species live together in their territory and the female lives in snail shells in a pit that they have dug in the sand. This species can reach a length of  TL.  This species can also be found in the aquarium trade.

Etymology
The specific name of this cichlid honours the Belgian born British ichthyologist and herpetologist George Albert Boulenger (1858-1937).

References

boulengeri
Taxa named by Franz Steindachner
Fish described in 1909
Fish of Lake Tanganyika
Taxonomy articles created by Polbot
Taxobox binomials not recognized by IUCN